Bence Stipsicz (born 3 February 1997) is a Hungarian professional ice hockey defenceman currently playing for Fehérvár AV19 of the ICE Hockey League (ICEHL).

References

External links
 

1997 births
Living people
Cedar Rapids RoughRiders players
Fehérvár AV19 players
Hungarian ice hockey defencemen
Ice hockey people from Budapest